Rolling is a town in Langlade County, Wisconsin, United States. The population was 1,504 at the 2010 census. The unincorporated community of Elmhurst is located within the town.

Geography
Rolling is in southern Langlade County, bordered to the south by Shawano County and to the west by Marathon County. It is bordered to the north partly by the city of Antigo, the Langlade county seat.

The northwest part of the town is drained by Spring Brook, a southwest-flowing tributary of the Eau Claire River, a tributary of the Wisconsin River and thus part of the Mississippi River watershed, while the hillier southeast part of the town drains to the Middle Branch of the Embarrass River, which runs southeast toward the Wolf River and eventually Green Bay on Lake Michigan.

Demographics
As of the census of 2000, there were 1,452 people, 512 households, and 415 families residing in the town. The population density was 40.3 people per square mile (15.6/km2).  There were 539 housing units at an average density of 15.0 per square mile (5.8/km2). The racial makeup of the town was 98.21% White, 0.55% Native American, 0.07% Asian, and 1.17% from two or more races. Hispanic or Latino of any race were 1.10% of the population.

There were 512 households, out of which 39.8% had children under the age of 18 living with them, 71.3% were married couples living together, 5.9% had a female householder with no husband present, and 18.9% were non-families. 14.8% of all households were made up of individuals, and 6.3% had someone living alone who was 65 years of age or older. The average household size was 2.84 and the average family size was 3.13.

In the town, the population was spread out, with 27.4% under the age of 18, 8.1% from 18 to 24, 31.1% from 25 to 44, 22.5% from 45 to 64, and 10.9% who were 65 years of age or older. The median age was 36 years. For every 100 females, there were 110.1 males. For every 100 females age 18 and over, there were 105.9 males.

The median income for a household in the town was $43,026, and the median income for a family was $47,969. Males had a median income of $30,398 versus $20,952 for females. The per capita income for the town was $17,946. About 5.5% of families and 6.6% of the population were below the poverty line, including 8.8% of those under age 18 and 5.8% of those age 65 or over.

References

Towns in Langlade County, Wisconsin
Towns in Wisconsin